Rudolf Marschall (December 3, 1873 – 1967 ) Austrian sculptor and medalist, born in Vienna.  He studied in Vienna and Paris and became the Director of the Austrian State School of Engineering in 1905.  He is best remembered for his portraits, medallions and bas-reliefs.

References

1873 births
1967 deaths
Austrian male sculptors
Austrian medallists
20th-century sculptors
Sculptors from the Austro-Hungarian Empire